Rechnoy Vokzal may refer to:
Rechnoy Vokzal (Moscow Metro), a station of the Zamoskvoretskaya Line of the Moscow Metro
Rechnoy Vokzal (Novosibirsk Metro), a station of the Leninskaya Line of the Novosibirsk Metro
North River Terminal, Moscow